The 1997 Kansas City Wizards season was the second in team and MLS history. Played at Arrowhead Stadium in Kansas City, Missouri.MLS did not allow matches to end in ties and thus Shootouts were used to decide draws, the stats that follow do not include shootout goals scored and the teams actually point total in the regular season was 49 even though it is shown below as 63. Shootout win= 2 points, Shootout loss= 0 points.

Squad

Competitions

Major League Soccer

U.S. Open Cup

MLS Cup Playoffs

Eastern Conference semifinals

Squad statistics

Final Statistics

References

1997
American soccer clubs 1997 season
Kansas City Wizards